Knin is a city in the Šibenik-Knin County of Croatia, located in the Dalmatian hinterland near the source of the river Krka, an important traffic junction on the rail and road routes between Zagreb and Split. Knin rose to prominence twice in history, as the capital of both the medieval Kingdom of Croatia and, briefly, of the unrecognized self-proclaimed Republic of Serbian Krajina for the duration of Croatian War of Independence from 1991 to 1995.

Etymology
The name is likely derived from the Illyrian Ninia. According to an alternative explanation, offered by Franz Miklosich and Petar Skok, the name - derived from a Slavic root *tьn- ("to cut", "to chop") - has a meaning of "cleared forest". The medieval names of Knin include ; ; . The Latin name is still used as a titular episcopal see, the Diocese of Tinum.

History

Ancient
The area consisting of today's Knin, or more specifically, the Spas hill, was inhabited since the stone age.
In the vicinity of today's Knin was once a town called Burnum, which served as a Roman military camp in the 1st century BC.

Middle Ages
The original settlement grew atop the Spas hill in the earliest history and which later formed the castle of Knin. The first church, a monastery dedicated to Saint Bartholomew, was built during the time of Trpimir I in the 9th century in Kapitul (south-east from Knin Castle, where the later bishopric was located). It was later expanded or rebuilt by a certain Duke of Croatia, probably Svetoslav, during the reign of king Stephen Držislav of Croatia in the 10th century.

Knin is first mentioned in the 10th-century work De Administrando Imperio as the centre of the Knin county (županija), and as one of the populated towns in Croatia. Around 1040, at the behest of the Croatian kings, a seat of the royal bishop was established in the nearby royal village of Biskupija (Kosovo), in the church of Saint Mary. The first "bishop of the Croats" is named Marko Giudice, and he and his successors were attached to the royal court as preachers and king's "special bishops" until 1102.

In the second half of the 11th century, Knin became a more permanent royal residence of king Demetrius Zvonimir around 1080. Because of this, it has led to Knin being known as the "City of Croatian Kings" or "Zvonimir's City" (Zvonimirov grad) in recent times. In the following decade, during the succession crisis, the city was the permanent residence of a local lord Petar Svačić, who contested the crown of Croatia until his defeat by king Coloman of Hungary in 1096. At that point, it came into possession of the Hungarian Arpad dynasty, and since then, it ceased to be a permanent royal residence but remained as a political and administrative center of the kingdom. The parish church dedicated to king Saint Stephen is thought to have been built during this period.

 
In 1178, it is for the first time mentioned as "civitates" (city) in a contemporary local source. Due to the extinction of the local ruling dynasty, the Croatian bishop moved his see to Knin itself, after which he started calling himself the Bishop of Knin. This precipitated the construction of a new cathedral, which was initiated in 1203 by the son of the Duke of Knin, Dobroslav in Kapitul.

The city was visited by Queen Maria Laskarina, the daughter of the Byzantine Emperor and wife of king Béla IV of Hungary, together with her retinue of nobles and a great number of soldiers in 1261 in order to introduce her son to the Croatian nobility and to negotiate their oath in recognizing him as the designated duke (herceg). In 1264, the first case of judicial function in the city was mentioned and during this time, Knin was the seat of both the Croatian ban, and the duke, who acted as a semi-independent ruler with close connection to the king and whose chancellor had been the bishop of Knin. Between 1270 and 1272, the new cathedral was consecrated on the orders of the Knin bishop Nicholas. The cathedral is described as being "magnificent" and "solemn" by subsequent documents. By this point, a new town had already developed outside the castle complex. A market square (forum) was for the first time mentioned in the second half of 13th century.

The transition from 13th to 14th century was marked in the rise of the Šubić noble family, whose members likely made Knin as one of the seats within their realm. According to the 19th century Franciscan friar and historian Donato Fabianich, the monastery of Saint Catherine was founded around this time by the Knin dignitaries and nobility which were first settled there by Mladen Šubić. Their rule over Knin came to an end at the Battle of Bliska in 1322, after which the Angevin king Charles Robert arrived in the city and imprisoned the former lord Mladen II Šubić of Bribir. Upon the departure of the king to Hungary, the noble Ivan Nelipić quickly seized Knin, and from there expelled the king's men from Croatia. Thus, these territories de facto continued to remain outside the monarchy, and the Nelipić noble family made Knin their permanent seat and ruled their territories as "Princes of Knin".

After successfully warring against their enemies, the Dalmatian cities and nobility under Juraj II Šubić of Bribir (who was imprisoned in the castle's dungeons), as well as the royal forces commanded by the Slavonian ban Mikac Prodanić, their rule came to an end when Louis I of Hungary personally led an army to re-establish royal power over Knin in 1345. During this time it became known that the castle consisted of two major parts, administered by two castellans and which was populated by houses and baths, a palace with a main hall used previously by the Nelipić's to sign an alliance with the Republic of Venice and to enforce customs on imports to the city. An annual trade fair, on Saint Bartholomew's day is known to have taken place in the settlement below since at least the 1360s and was regularly attended by the merchants from the Dalmatian cities. It is known that Knin's also burg housed a significant colony of merchants originating from these cities which also gives insight into its commercial importance. A supreme judicial body for the whole of Croatia was formed, composed of Croatian nobility, and was located on the castle grounds. A chapel dedicated to Saint Bartholomew located within the cathedral was the place of notary of the Knin See. There the noble Ivan Nelipić (son of Vladislava) had reaffirmed his rights to the estates and lands in Cetina during his stay in the city.

Using the dynastic instability in the neighboring lands, the city came into the hands of the Bosnian king Tvrtko I during the year of 1388. The previous bishop had likely been expelled, where the Ragusan Mihailo took his place, and was also given the office of the king's chancellor. These actions provoked a retaliation of king Sigismund, whose armies besieged Knin in September 1390. The city, along with other territories were returned to Sigismund in 1393. Upon his return from the disastrous battle of Nicopolis in 1396, the king spent a month in Knin to consolidate his holdings and state affairs of Dalmatia and Croatia, issuing various decrees together with his ban Nikola Gorjanski. In 1401, the city was besieged by the Bosnian king Stephen Ostoja, who encamped in the adjacent Knin field (Kninsko polje), and remained there until the following year. The newly crowned king Ladislaus of Naples attained support from the castellan of Knin and issued his first decree there in 1403.

Because of frequent harassment, the citizens of Knin had to pay tribute to the duke Hrvoje Vukčić Hrvatinić, and for a short while, the city seemed to have been directly under his rule. The presence of Franciscans is for the first time mentioned in the 15th century, which were located in the old Saint Mary's church and monastery in the city. Apart from them, other religious buildings are mentioned such as the church of the Holy Spirit.

Its strategic position played an important role in many wars and power changes – the Republic of Venice often reflected on its importance as a key castle and the main entrance to Dalmatia, which it attempted to obtain during the 15th century. During these years both the city, the ban and his dignitaries played a crucial role in the struggle for dominance over the coastal cities with Venice. In 1430 Knin and the Church of St. Bartolomeo in Kapitul were the centre of the "Union and Brotherhood of the Croats", a congregation of Croatian nobles formed by 12 counties of Croatia in order to "preserve the fame and old customs of the Croatian Kingdom".

It was in 1420 that the Nelipić noble family again regained their former role in Croatia with the emergence of Ivaniš Nelipić, which again distanced these territories from the crown. These possessions were later acquired after Ivaniš's death in 1435 by Anž of the House of Frankopan through the marriage with the Nelipić nobles. Knin and the surrounding possessions were restored to the crown upon Anž's death in 1437. In 1454 an attempt between the Bosnian king and the Venetians was made to acquire the city, which was referenced as "capital and foremost place of Croatia" in their letters.

During the reign of king Matthias Corvinus, the bishops of Knin were selected as the king's principal orators abroad in collecting the help needed against the invading Ottoman Empire. The bishop was thus first secretly involved at the pope to solicit financial aid for Matthias' military campaign. The city's distant surroundings quickly became a target for Ottoman raids. As the raids were becoming more frequent, one of them reached Knin, where a Franciscan monastery has been recorded to have been destroyed in 1469.

In 1493, the first direct attempt of siege by the Ottomans was undertaken, which was followed by ban John Corvinus and his deputies invading and pillaging the Ottoman territories from the city. The Republic of Venice started to financially support the city's defences in fear for its possessions in Dalmatia. In 1501, three Ottoman spies were caught and imprisoned by the vice-ban. They were sent by the Sanjak-bey of Bosnia, and had infiltrated Knin posing as friars that were on their way to sell vestments to the market. They were to investigate the situation in the Zadar surrounding.

The last major conflict around Knin before the truce was in September 1502 when 2,000 Ottoman cavalrymen looted the area. On 20 August 1503 King Vladislaus II concluded a 7-year peace treaty with Sultan Bayezid II. The armistice was generally respected by all sides, during which Knin's defensive positions were strengthened in 1504. A period of severe famine started in 1505 that affected entire Dalmatia. In 1510 the plague halved Knin's population.

In 1510 around 1,000 Ottoman Akıncı raided the countryside of Knin. There had been word that viceban of Croatia was captured on that occasion. Baltazar Baćan, viceban of Slavonia, together with forces from the Zagreb Bishopry, managed to lift the siege of Knin in January 1513. Next year in February the Ottomans laid siege on Knin with 10,000 men from the Sanjak of Bosnia, but were unable to take the city and lost 500 troops. Knin's burg and outskirts were burned on this occasion. These clashes left Knin devastated and there was no news about the city for five years. Local population was decimated by war, hunger, plague and migration to safer places, and its economy was hindered by the seizure of crops and livestock. Due to Knin's strategic value, King Louis II responded to requests from captains of Knin, Skradin and Ostrovica and promised reinforcements of 1,000 infantry and 1,000 cavalrymen. However, it is unlikely that these forces arrived to the endangered towns.

On 29 May 1522 after the final siege of the Knin castle, it fell to the Ottoman Empire, and Croats left the town in large numbers. The Ottomans repopulated the town with new inhabitants from Bosnia.

Ottoman and Venetian period

The bishops who held the title no longer resided in Knin after it fell to the Ottoman Turks in 1522. It was initially part of the Sanjak of Kilis, later the centre of the Sanjak of Kırka, was founded in 1574. By 1540, Ottomans massively populated area between Skradin and Knin with Vlachs.
It was briefly captured by Venice in 1648 during Cretan War. After Venice captured the district in 1688, the Bishop of Šibenik was appointed to administer the diocese, which was united in 1828 to Šibenik. The bishopric is today the titular see of Tinum.

A century and a half later, on 11 September 1688, it was captured by the Venetian Republic. Subsequently, the Croatian population partially returned and the Franciscans built a monastery and a church there in 1708. Ottomans aimed to retake Knin during Ottoman-Venetian War, but their siege was repulsed in 1715.

Habsburg era

Knin passed on to the Habsburgs together with Dalmatia in 1797 according to the Treaty of Campo Formio. After the Peace of Pressburg in 1805, the French Empire gained the city and incorporated it into the Illyrian Provinces in 1809. By 1813, the Austrians regained control over the town. By the end of the 19th century, as a part of the Habsburg domain of Dalmatia, Knin grew steadily, becoming an important commercial as well as road and railway center. In 1867, Knin became a part of Dalmatia – a territorial entity within Cisleithania.

Modern

Kingdom of Yugoslavia and World War II
After the First World War, Knin became a part of the State of Slovenes, Croats and Serbs in 1918, which after a brief Italian military occupation subsequently became part of the Kingdom of Serbs, Croats and Slovenes (named Kingdom of Yugoslavia after 1929). Previously only connected with rail to Šibenik and Split (with narrow gauge to Drvar and Prijedor as well), in 1925 Lika railway connected Knin with Zagreb and north in general. It gradually became a busy rail hub; already in 1927 a total of 58,000 passengers departed Knin rail station.

In World War II, Knin was in the so-called second Italian occupation zone, administered by the civilian authorities of the collaborationist Independent State of Croatia led by the fascist Ustaša regime, but with heavy Italian military presence. The Italians also relied heavily on local ethnic Serb militias (Chetniks) to maintain order and suppress partisan resistance. The entire area was the scene of the Croatian genocide campaign against the local Serb population. The Ustaša regime declared Knin the county seat of Bribir and Sidraga. After the Italian surrender in September 1943, German forces became the main factor in the region. As the war progressed and partisan forces liberated most of Dalmatia, with Germans pulling out and retreating northwards, Axis and partisan forces pitted against each other in Knin in a major battle in early December 1944. The 8th Dalmatian Corps sought to destroy the German, Ustaše and Chetnik formations in North Dalmatia and the city of Knin. With around 50,000 troops involved and more than 7,000 casualties on all sides, the Partisans liberated Knin on 9 December. Five Knin natives who fought in partisan ranks were proclaimed People's Heroes: Miro Višić, Jošo Durbaba, Boško Žunić, Stevo G. Opačić and Stevo S. Opačić.

Socialist Yugoslavia

Between 1945 and 1990, Knin saw rapid industrialization and modernization, becoming a centre of a wider region. Una railway was opened in 1948 and Knin-Zadar railway in 1967, making Knin train station one of the most important and busiest hubs in Croatia.

Croatian War of Independence
From October 1990, eight months before Croatia declared independence (25 June 1991) from Yugoslavia, Knin became the main stronghold for the Serbs in the Knin region, eventually becoming the capital city of the unrecognized self-declared Republic of Serbian Krajina in 1991. The leaders of Krajina were Knin locals: Milan Martić and Milan Babić, both convicted for ethnic cleansing of Croats and other non-Serbs from Krajina by ICTY. Widespread acts of murder and violence, detention and intimidation became pervasive throughout the RSK territory from 1992 to 1995. During that time 93.9% of Croats were expelled from the town and municipality of Knin. Serbs held the town until Croatian forces captured it during Operation Storm on 5 August 1995. The date is today marked as a Victory Day in Croatia.

In February 2015, during the Croatia–Serbia genocide case, the International Court of Justice (ICJ) dismissed the Serbian lawsuit claim that Operation Storm constituted genocide ruling that Croatia did not have the specific intent to exterminate the country's Serb minority, though it reaffirmed that serious crimes against Serb civilians had taken place. Fleeing civilians and people remaining in United Nations protected areas were subject to various forms of harassment, including military assaults and acts by Croatian civilians. On 8 August, a refugee column was shelled. Human Rights Watch reported, in 1996, that the vast majority of the abuses were committed by Croatian forces. These abuses, which continued on a large scale even months after Operation Storm, included summary executions of elderly and infirm Serbs who remained behind and the wholesale burning and destruction of Serbian villages and property. Executions of civilians took place in and around the town of Knin.

The majority of the population had already fled by the time the Croatian Army took control of Knin. At the end of the war, Knin's demographic composition changed greatly with the influx of Croat refugees from Bosnia and former Croat militia members. They replaced, to a great extent, those Serbs who fled during Operation Storm. In 2015, Amnesty International report that Croatian Serbs continued to face discrimination in public sector employment and the restitution of tenancy rights to social housing vacated during the war.

Geography

The original Roman settlement developed on the foothills of the Dinaric Alps. It was on these foothills that the Knin Fortress was built. The source of the Krka river begins on the outskirts of the town.

Climate

Knin has a modified Mediterranean climate (Cfa, nearing the border with Csa) with hot dry summers and cool winters. Although the city is only some 50 km (31 mi) from the Adriatic Sea, an arm of the Mediterranean, the proximity of the Dinaric Alps to the north alters its climate. Knin is particularly known for its hot summers: temperatures reaching 40 °C (104 °F) are not uncommon in July and August. The January average temperature is about 4 °C and in August is about 24 °C

Demographics

According to 2021 census data, the population in Knin municipality was 11,755 and in town proper 8,317. 29,8% of population is of the age of 60 or older, while 18,6% of population is 20 or younger. Croatian Bureau of Statistics estimated the population of Knin municipality on 31 December 2020 to stand at 11,286. This represents a steep decline: ten years earlier, in the 2011 census, Knin municipality had a population of 15,388, while Knin (town, proper) had a population of 10,493. In the 2001 census, the population of Knin was 15,190 (whole municipality) with 11,128 in town proper. Ethnically, Croats formed the majority with 76.45% while the population share of Serbs stood at 20.8%.

Knin has recently seen a steep population decline, not least due to high emigration rates, especially since Croatia joined the EU in 2013 and its citizens consequently face few to no work and immigration restrictions. Elementary school student population in Knin (ages 6 to 14) has sharply declined by 29% between 2013 and 2019. Knin's population is also in more flux than that of other Croatian cities given that it has a major refugee problem: both with a large number of Croats from neighbouring Bosnia-Herzegovina who immigrated there post-1995 and Serbs from Knin who are still refugees in Bosnia-Herzegovina or Serbia. Immigrant Croats form the majority in the city with only a scattered Serb presence in the surrounding villages.

Demographic history
Before the Croatian War of Independence 87% of the population of the municipality and 79% of the city were Serbs. During the war, most of the non-Serb population was displaced from Knin, while in the last days of the war most of the Serbs left Knin, fearing incoming Croatian forces. In February 2015, during the Croatia–Serbia genocide case, the judgment of the International Court of Justice stated that it is not disputed that a substantial part of the Serb population fled that region as a direct consequence of the military actions. The Croatian authorities were aware that the operation would provoke a mass exodus; they even to some extent predicated their military planning on such an exodus, which they considered not only probable, but desirable. As a consequence of the war and population displacement, Knin municipality population has nearly halved between 1991 and 2001 (from 23 to 15 thousand).

Knin (municipality)
Besides the town of Knin itself, Knin municipality today consists of following settlements: Golubić, Kninsko Polje, Kovačić, Ljubač, Oćestovo, Plavno, Polača, Potkonje, Radljevac, Strmica, Vrpolje and Žagrović. The data below and in the population graph is based on current municipality, since in the past Knin municipality often changed its borders.

Knin (town)

Town of Knin had a small population compared to its surroundings until the aftermath of World War II. Just 15% of population of municipality lived in Knin proper; neighbouring Plavno, Oćestovo and Polača had basically the same or even larger population than Knin. With increased urbanisation and industrialization in post-WWII socialist era (1945-1991), Knin urban population rapidly increased from 2,600 to 12,300. At that point, more than a half of municipality's population lived in the town of Knin. After 1991, due to the war and population displacement, as well as transition shock and deindustrialization, population has been steadily declining.

The 1857 data shows that 75,55% of the town population was Roman Catholic. According to the Austrian Census held in 1900, the town of Knin had 1,302 residents. In 1910 the town had 1,270 citizens. After 1945, with urbanization and modernization, Knin attracted much of the countryside population which was overwhelmingly Serbian Orthodox. As a consequence, ethnic/religious composition of town changed as well. Intermarriages and a desire to straddle the divide between the communities resulted at one point in a substantial part of the population declaring themselves as Yugoslavs rather than either Croats or Serbs (22% in 1981 census).
Population of the town from 1830 to 2011, based on religion, language and ethnicity was as follows:

Archeology
The recently discovered Roman town Burnum is 18 km away from Knin in direction of Kistanje. There are the remains of the biggest amphitheater in Dalmatia built in 77 AD, during the rule of Emperor Vespasian which could host 8,000 people.

The nearby villages Biskupija and Kapitul are extremely interesting archeological sites from the 10th century where many remains of medieval Croatian culture are found including churches, graves, decorations, and epigraphs.

Sport

The most successful sports in Knin lately have been track and field and martial arts. The latter is particularly popular with two taekwondo clubs active. Matea Jelić, Knin native (*1997) started practicing taekwando in Knin and later became 2020 Olympic champion in 67 kg. Track and field club "Sv. Ante" (St. Anthony) in Knin boasts Croatian 100m and 200m sprint as well as long jump national champion, Marko Čeko, who also won the Hanžeković memorial in 2020 in men's long jump.

The main football club in Knin is NK Dinara, formed in 1913. NK Dinara's colours were black and white until 2005 when the club changed its colours to red, white and blue. NK Dinara plays in the 4th, lowest division in Croatia, Šibenik-Knin County League (1. Županijska liga Šibensko-kninska).

Knin has a sports association which was formed in 1998. Basketball is also popular in Knin with an amateur women's and men's club playing in lower tiers. The Croatian National basketball team has played a match in Knin. They played against Israel in 1999 where Croatia won the match 78:68. Other sports played in Knin are rugby, handball, volleyball, kickboxing, karate, tennis  and taekwondo.

In 2007 the Croatia national rugby union team beat an Irish Barbarians side to win their first ever trophy, the St. Patrick's Day Cup organised by Alan Moore in Knin.

Transport

The most important intercity roadway in Knin is the Croatian state route D1. The route makes for easy access of Knin from the major coastal city of Split. The section of D1 from Knin to A1 highway will be upgraded to the expressway level in following years (with B1 expressway).

Knin is also an important railway junction as the railroads from the rest of Dalmatia and its cities of Zadar, Split and Šibenik pass through Knin, going north to the capital city of Croatia, Zagreb, via M604 railway. There are four lines meeting in Knin station: to Perković (and then to Split or Šibenik), to Zadar, to Ogulin (and onwards to Karlovac, Zagreb) and to Martin Brod (and Bihać, Sisak, Zagreb). Only the former three lines offer passenger transport. The latter route, Knin-Bihać-Zagreb, passes through Bosnian territory, crossing the border many times, thus it is not used for passenger transport since the beginning of the war in 1991. However, it is the shortest route between Knin and Zagreb, and as such was electrified in 1984 (the catenary being subsequently destroyed by war operations in the early 1990s). Electrification had started from Yugoslav inland towards the coast and had only reached Knin, so today the Knin station sidings are equipped with overhead catenary, but lines leaving the town are not.

Towns and villages in the municipality

Golubić
Knin
Kninsko Polje
Kovačić
Ljubač
Oćestovo
Plavno
Polača
Potkonje
Radljevac
Strmica
Vrpolje
Žagrović

Notable people
 Ratko Adamović (b. 1942), Serbian writer
 Marija Ilić Agapova (1895–1984), Serbian librarian and translator
 Dragana Atlija (b. 1986), Miss Serbia 2009
 Milan Babić (1956–2006), 1st president of Republic of Serbian Krajina and former mayor of Knin
  (1913–1937), Yugoslav volunteer in the Spanish Civil War
 Frane Cota (1898–1951), Croatian sculptor at the 1924 Summer Olympics
 Momčilo Đujić (1907–1999), Dalmatian Serbian Orthodox priest and Chetnik voivode
 Electra Elite, Serbian singer and sex worker
 Branko Grčić (b. 1964), Croatian politician and economist
 Marko Jelić (b. 1976), Croatian biology professor and former mayor of Knin
 Vojin Jelić (1921–2004), Croatian writer and poet
 Drago Kovačević (1953–2019), Serbian politician and writer and former mayor of Knin
 Ljubomir Marić (b. 1977), Serbian and Kosovar politician
 Mirko Marjanović (1937–2006), former prime minister of Serbia
 Milan Martić (b. 1954), 3rd president of Republic of Serbian Krajina
 Lovro Monti (1835–1898), Dalmatian politician
 Zdravko Ponoš (b. 1962), Serbian politician
 Hrvoje Požar (1916–1991), Croatian engineer
 Jovan Radulović (1951–2018), Serbian writer
 Jovan Rašković (1929–1992), Croatian psychiatrist and politician
 Josipa Rimac (b. 1980), former mayor of Knin
 Anja Šimpraga (b. 1987), current deputy prime minister of Croatia
 Dinko Šimunović (1873–1933), Croatian writer
 Janko Veselinović (b. 1965), Serbian lawyer and professor of law
 Soraja Vučelić (b. 1986), Serbian–Montenegrin model
 Dušan Zelenbaba (b. 1952), Croatian physician and politician

Sportspeople
 Nemanja Bezbradica (b. 1993), Serbian basketball player
 Darko Bjedov (b. 1989), Serbian footballer
 Kosta Bjedov (b. 1986), Serbian footballer
 Igor Bjelan (b. 1992), Serbian badminton player
 Valentina Blažević (b. 1994), Serbian handball player
 Milan Borjan (b. 1987), Canadian footballer
 Dejan Borovnjak (b. 1986), Serbian basketball player
 Vladimir Buač (b. 1984), Croatian footballer and coach
 Jovan Damjanović (b. 1982), Serbian footballer and football manager
 Milan Damjanović (1943–2006), Yugoslav–Serbian footballer
 Miloš Degenek (b. 1994), Australian footballer
 Milica Deura (b. 1990), Bosnian basketball player
 Ognjen Dobrić (b. 1994), Serbian basketball player
 Marta Drpa (b. 1989), Serbian volleyball player
 Lazo Džepina (b. 1966), Croatian footballer and football manager
 Božena Erceg (b. 1981), Croatian basketball player
 Aleksandar Gugleta (b. 1991), Serbian handball player
 Matea Jelić (b. 1997), Croatian taekwondo athlete
 Leon Kreković (b. 2000), Croatian footballer
 Sava Lešić (b. 1988), Serbian basketball player
 Sasa Macura (b. 1991), Australian footballer
 Sanda Malešević (b. 1994), Serbian footballer
 Arsen Marjan (b. 1975), Serbian footballer
 Bojan Miljuš (b. 1994), Serbian footballer
 Branko Miljuš (b. 1960), Croatian footballer
 Dejan Miljuš (b. 1994), Serbian footballer
 Miloš Perišić (b. 1995), Serbian footballer
 Ilija Petković (1945–2020), Serbian footballer and football manager
 Milan Pršo (b. 1990), Serbian footballer
 Ljubomir Ristovski (b. 1969), Serbian footballer and football manager 
 Bojan Sanković (b. 1993), Montenegrin footballer
 Dalibor Škorić (b. 1971), Serbian footballer
 Dejan Sorgić (b. 1989), Swiss footballer
 Miloš Tintor (b. 1986), Serbian footballer
 Mladen Veselinović (b. 1992), Serbian footballer
 Vojislav Vranjković (b. 1983), Serbian footballer
 Radomir Vukčević (1941–2014), Yugoslav footballer
 Marija Vuković (b. 1992), Montenegrin high jumper
 Vladimir Zelenbaba (b. 1982), Serbian footballer
 Nemanja Zelenović (b. 1990), Serbian handball player
 Milan Zorica (b. 1992), Serbian footballer

See also

 Church of Saint Anthony, Knin

References

Sources

Further reading

Mrđen, S., & Jurić, A. (2018). The effect of war and post-war migrations on the demographic composition of the Town of Knin (1991-2011). Geoadria, 23(1), 85-122. https://doi.org/10.15291/geoadria.1499

External links

  
 Tourist information about Knin area
 National Tourist Board about Knin

 
Cities and towns in Croatia
Roman towns and cities in Croatia
Medieval Kingdom of Croatia
Former capitals of Croatia
Capitals of former nations
Populated places in Šibenik-Knin County
Kingdom of Dalmatia